Litoria havina is a species of frog in the subfamily Pelodryadinae. It is found in New Guinea.

Its natural habitats are subtropical or tropical moist lowland forests, subtropical or tropical swamps, subtropical or tropical moist montane forests, rivers, freshwater marshes, intermittent freshwater marshes, heavily degraded former forests, and canals and ditches.

It is threatened by habitat loss.

Description

Litoria havina emits a whistling call of one long and two short notes.  Males of the species have a fleshy nose spike.

Habitat and ecology

Litoria havina resides in swamps in tropical forests. It breeds in stagnant pools. As the embryo develops, the eggs turn brown. When the eggs hatch, the tadpoles drop into the water below.

References

Litoria
Amphibians of New Guinea
Amphibians described in 1993
Taxonomy articles created by Polbot